Tetu Constituency is an electoral constituency in Kenya. It was established in 1988 and is one of the six constituencies in Nyeri County.

Tetu Constituency comprises the Tetu Division of Nyeri County and is located entirely within the Nyeri County Council area. Tetu constituency has only three Wards, the least number of wards out of the constituencies in Nyeri county.

Its most famous representatives are: The iconic liberal leader of the Mau Mau, Dedan Kimathi Waciuri (31 October 1920 – 18 February 1957) and Dr. Wangari Maathai (1940-2011), who served for the session from 2002 to 2007. During her period in office she was awarded the Nobel Peace Prize of 2004, being the first African woman to win this award and, remarkably, still one of the first 35 women Nobel Laureates in any category. Dr. Maathai died of cancer within five years of stepping down from this office.

Members of Parliament

Wards

References

External links 
Tetu Constituency
Uchaguzikenya.com - Constituency profile

Constituencies in Nyeri County
Constituencies in Central Province (Kenya)
1988 establishments in Kenya
Constituencies established in 1988